RNA-binding protein 39 is a protein that in humans is encoded by the RBM39 gene.

Function 

The protein encoded by this gene is an RNA binding protein and possible splicing factor. The encoded protein is found in the nucleus, where it colocalizes with core spliceosomal proteins. Studies of a mouse protein with high sequence similarity to this protein suggest that this protein may act as a transcriptional coactivator for JUN/AP-1 and estrogen receptors. Multiple transcript variants encoding different isoforms have been observed for this gene.

Interactions 

RBM39 has been shown to interact with Estrogen receptor alpha, Estrogen receptor beta and C-jun.

References

Further reading